Jessika Harling (born November 15, 1993), better known by her stage name Jessia, is a Canadian pop singer from Ucluelet, British Columbia, best known for her 2021 single "I'm Not Pretty".

A graduate of the music program at MacEwan University, she released "I'm Not Pretty" as a TikTok video in early 2021, and signed to Republic Records soon afterward. She released her debut EP, How Are You?, in October 2021.

She won the Juno Award for Breakthrough Artist of the Year at the Juno Awards of 2022, and was nominated for Single of the Year for "I'm Not Pretty", Pop Album of the Year for How Are You? and the Fan Choice Award. "I'm Not Pretty" was certified gold by RIAA in April 2022.

In 2023, she participated in an all-star recording of Serena Ryder's single "What I Wouldn't Do", which was released as a charity single to benefit Kids Help Phone's Feel Out Loud campaign for youth mental health.

Discography

Extended plays

Singles

As lead artist

References

External links

21st-century Canadian women singers
Canadian pop singers
Musicians from British Columbia
Living people
People from the Alberni-Clayoquot Regional District
Year of birth missing (living people)
Juno Award for Breakthrough Artist of the Year winners